Saroglitazar (INN, trade name Lipaglyn) is a drug for the treatment of type 2 diabetes mellitus and dyslipidemia. It is approved for use in India by the Drug Controller General of India. Saroglitazar is indicated for the treatment of diabetic dyslipidemia and hypertriglyceridemia with type 2 diabetes mellitus not controlled by statin therapy. In clinical studies, saroglitazar has demonstrated reduction of triglycerides (TG), LDL cholesterol, VLDL cholesterol, non-HDL cholesterol and an increase in HDL cholesterol a characteristic hallmark of atherogenic diabetic dyslipidemia (ADD). It has also shown anti-diabetic medication properties by reducing the fasting plasma glucose and HBA1c in diabetes patients.

Mechanism of action
Saroglitazar is an insulin sensitizer. It is a first in class drug which acts as a dual PPAR agonist at the subtypes α (alpha) and γ (gamma) of the peroxisome proliferator-activated receptor (PPAR). Agonist action on PPARα lowers high blood triglycerides, and agonist action on PPARγ improves insulin resistance and consequently lowers blood sugar.

Efficacy
Being a dual PPAR agonist, saroglitazar helps in controlling blood glucose and lipid parameters, especially high triglycerides and high non-HDL cholesterol. A study done in rats concluded that saroglitazar has the potential to prevent the progression of retinopathy in diabetes patients. Using preclinical models, it has also been shown to be useful in diabetic nephropathy.

Safety
No major serious adverse events have been reported; however, long-term cardiovascular safety has not been established.

References 

PPAR agonists
Carboxylic acids